The 1989–90 season of the European Cup Winners' Cup was won for the only time by Sampdoria in the final against Anderlecht, 2–0 at Nya Ullevi in Gothenburg, on 9 May 1990. They went on to win 1990–91 Serie A, also being runners-up in the 1991–92 European Cup and in the 1988–89 European Cup Winners' Cup. English clubs were still banned from Europe following the Heysel Stadium disaster, meaning Liverpool missed out on a place, but would have a representative again the following season.

Preliminary round

|}

First leg

Second leg

Dinamo Tirana won 5–3 on aggregate.

First round

|}
 1 The first leg of the Partizan—Celtic tie was played at Bijeli Brijeg Stadium in Mostar instead of FK Partizan's home ground in Belgrade due to the club being punished by UEFA as a result of crowd trouble during their 1988–89 UEFA Cup second round first leg match vs AS Roma. Part of the punishment for FK Partizan was playing home matches at least 300 km away from home.

First leg

Second leg

Real Valladolid won 6–0 on aggregate.

Monaco won 4–1 on aggregate.

BFC Dynamo won 4–2 on aggregate.

Borussia Dortmund won 3–1 on aggregate.

Sampdoria won 3–0 on aggregate.

Torpedo Moscow won 6–0 on aggregate.

Grasshopper won 4–3 on aggregate.

Anderlecht won 10–0 on aggregate.

Barcelona won 2–1 on aggregate.

Admira Wacker won 3–1 on aggregate.

Panathinaikos won 6–5 on aggregate.

Dinamo București won 2–1 on aggregate.

Groningen won 3–1 on aggregate.

Djurgården won 5–0 on aggregate.

Ferencváros won 6–2 on aggregate.

6–6 on aggregate; Partizan won on away goals.

Second round

|}

First leg

Second leg

Real Valladolid won 4–2 on aggregate.

1–1 on aggregate; Monaco won on away goals.

Sampdoria won 3–1 on aggregate.

Grasshopper won 4–1 on aggregate.

Anderlecht won 3–2 on aggregate.

Admira Wacker won 2–0 on aggregate.

Dinamo București won 8–1 on aggregate.

Partizan won 6–5 on aggregate.

Quarter-finals

{{TwoLegResult|Real Valladolid|ESP|0–0 (1–3 p)|Monaco|FRA|0–0|0–0 (aet)}}

|}Notes' 1: The return leg of the Dinamo București—Partizan tie was played at the Pod Goricom Stadium in Titograd instead of Partizan's home ground in Belgrade since UEFA barred Partizan again from playing home matches within a 300 km radius of their home ground after more crowd trouble in the previous round's home tie vs FC Groningen.

First leg

Second leg0–0 on aggregate; Monaco won 3–1 on penalties.Anderlecht won 3–1 on aggregate.Dinamo București won 4–1 on aggregate.Sampdoria won 4–1 on aggregate.Semi-finals

|}

First leg

Second legSampdoria won 4–2 on aggregate.Anderlecht won 2–0 on aggregate.''

Final

Top scorers
The top scorers from the 1989–90 UEFA Cup Winners' Cup are as follows:

See also
 1989–90 European Cup
 1989–90 UEFA Cup

References

External links
 1989-90 competition at UEFA website
 Cup Winners' Cup results at Rec.Sport.Soccer Statistics Foundation
 Cup Winners Cup Seasons 1989-90 – results, protocols

3
UEFA Cup Winners' Cup seasons